Brian Francis Evans  is a New Zealand rugby union coach, and former head coach of the  women's national team.

Career
Evans coached De La Salle College to victory in 2008 in the National First XV Championship. He is currently the Back Attack & Defence Coach for Kelston Boys' High School where he is the Principal.

Provincial
In 2007 he coached the victorious Auckland Women's team.

International
Evans was appointed Head Coach of the  women's national team in 2009 with Grant Hansen as Assistant Coach.

Evans coached the Black Fern's to success as they won the 2010 Rugby World Cup. In 2011, He took a short break from coaching before returning as Head Coach in 2012.

Evans stepped down as Black Ferns head coach after a poor performance at the 2014 World Cup.

Honours
In the 2011 New Year Honours, Evans was appointed an Officer of the New Zealand Order of Merit (ONZM) for services to women's rugby.

References

Living people
New Zealand rugby union coaches
Place of birth missing (living people)
Year of birth missing (living people)
New Zealand women's national rugby union team coaches